Bangladesh participated in the 2010 Summer Youth Olympics in Singapore. The team included six athletes competing in three sports.

Archery

Boys

Girls

Mixed Team

Shooting

Rifle

Swimming

References

External links
 Competitors List: Bangladesh

Summer Youth Olympics
Nations at the 2010 Summer Youth Olympics
Bangladesh at the Youth Olympics